Naivaadhoo(Dhivehi: ނައިވާދޫ) is one of the inhabited islands of Haa Dhaalu Atoll administrative division and geographically part of Thiladhummathi Atoll in the north of the Maldives.

Ras Thun'di

Ras Thun'di is a picnic ground located in Naivaadhoo. 
 Hours of Operation : 24hrs
 Capacity :75 people and more.
 Tables : Yes
Cooking and Grill : Shelter for cooking and 2 grills for barbecue.
View : Beautiful view of beach, big enough for play picnic games.

Geography

Demography

Other government buildings in Naivaadhoo
 Naivaadhoo council idhaaraa
 Naivaadhoo Magistrate Court
 Mosque
 Naivaadhoo Health Center
 Naivaadhoo School

Clubs and NGOs in Naivaadhoo
There are four clubs and two NGOs operating in Naivaadhoo. They are:
 Trainers Sports Club 
 Naivaadhoo Zuvaanunge jamiyya
 Naivaadhoo Isdharivaruoge jamiyya

Holhuashi in Naivaadhoo
Holhuashi are social meeting places.
 Umarumaizaan
 Ban'dharu hiyaa
 Mdp holhu ashi

References

External links
 Naivaadhoo Twitter page
  Naivaadhoo Facebook page
  Naivaadhoo Website

Islands of the Maldives